Industry Standard is the sixth studio album by the Dixie Dregs, released in 1982. This was the second of two albums released under the moniker The Dregs, and is their only album featuring vocals (by Alex Ligertwood  of Santana and Patrick Simmons of The Doobie Brothers on one track each); it also garnered the group their fourth Grammy nomination. Ligertwood sang on "Crank It Up", while Simmons sang on and co-wrote "Ridin' High". Industry Standard was also the last album by The Dixie Dregs before their split in 1983, and their last one for 12 years until the release of Full Circle in 1994.

Track listing
All tracks are written by Steve Morse, except where noted.

"Assembly Line" – 4:25
"Crank It Up" (Morse, The Dregs) – 3:35
"Chips Ahoy" – 3:39
"Bloodsucking Leeches" – 3:59
"Up in the Air"  – 2:27
"Ridin' High" (Morse, Simmons) – 3:40
"Where's Dixie?" – 3:57
"Conversation Piece" – 6:12
"Vitamin Q" – 5:33

Personnel 
 T Lavitz – Keyboards, Saxophone
 Rod Morgenstein – Drums
 Steve Morse – Banjo, Guitar
 Mark O'Connor – Violin
 Andy West – Bass, Bass (Electric)

Guest Performers

 Steve Howe duet with Steve Morse, 'Up in the Air' – Guitar
 Alex Ligertwood – "Crank It Up" - Vocals
 Patrick Simmons – "Ridin' High" - Vocals

References

Dixie Dregs albums
1982 albums
Albums produced by Eddy Offord
Arista Records albums